Sterne is a surname. It is a variant of Stern, and as such, is either of English (meaning "strict") or German (meaning "star") origin, with many Ashkenazi Jews having adopted the surname as well, due to the Ashkenazi Jewish trend of adopting secular German surnames denoting either profession or natural elements during the early modern period when they were forced to Germanize and/or Slavicize their naming customs. As such, its bearers are concentrated in England, its former colonies, Germany, France, Central Europe and Eastern Europe. Notable people with the surname include:

Adolphus Sterne (1801–1852), American politician
Bobbie L. Sterne (born 1919), the Mayor of Cincinnati from 1975–1976 and 1978–1979
Carus Sterne (pen-name), see Ernst Krause
David Sterne, British actor
Emma Gelders Sterne (1894–1971), American writer
Gordon Sterne (1923–2017), German actor seen in An American Werewolf in London and Highlander
Hedda Sterne (1910–2011), Romanian painter
John Sterne (bishop of Colchester) (died 1607), Bishop of Colchester
John Sterne (bishop of Dromore) (1660–1745), Irish churchman
Laurence Sterne (1713–1768), an Irish-born English novelist and an Anglican clergyman
Maurice Sterne (1878–1957), American sculptor and painter
Richard Sterne (bishop) (c.1596–1683), a Church of England priest and Archbishop of York
Richard Sterne (golfer) (born 1981)
Robert Sterne Thomas The Scout Association Scouting notable, awardee of the Bronze Wolf in 1965
Simon Sterne (1839–1901), American lawyer and economist
Stuart Sterne (pen-name), see Gertrude Bloede (1845–1905)
Teresa Sterne (1927–2000), American concert pianist

Fictional characters:
Silas Sterne, children's book character in The Day My Bum Went Psycho (2001)

See also
Stern (surname)
Stearne, given name and surname